Randall H. Burridge (born January 7, 1966) is a Canadian former professional ice hockey player.

He played in 706 games in the National Hockey League, scoring 199 goals along with 251 assists for a total of 450 points, while accumulating 458 penalty minutes.

Career
Burridge was selected by the Boston Bruins in round 8, #157 overall in the 1985 NHL Entry Draft.  He started his career with the Bruins in 1985. His various nicknames included "Garbage", for all the garbage goals he collected, "Stump", for his short, stocky build, and "Stump Pump", for the fist pump he performed after scoring a goal.

Accomplishments
 With the Bruins, he was a two-time winner of the Seventh Player Award (performing above and beyond expectations)
 Won the Elizabeth C. Dufresne Trophy in 1989 as the Bruins' home MVP.
 Played in the 1992 NHL All-Star Game
 Tim Horton Memorial Award (Unsung Hero) as well as the Punch Imlach Memorial Award (Dedication and Leadership) in 1995–96.

Career statistics

References

External links

Randy Burridge Real Estate.

1966 births
Living people
Baltimore Skipjacks players
Boston Bruins draft picks
Boston Bruins players
Buffalo Sabres players
Canadian ice hockey forwards
Hannover Scorpions players
Ice hockey people from Ontario
Las Vegas Thunder players
Los Angeles Kings players
Moncton Golden Flames players
National Hockey League All-Stars
Peterborough Petes (ice hockey) players
Rochester Americans players
Sportspeople from Fort Erie, Ontario
Washington Capitals players
Canadian expatriate ice hockey players in Germany